Macará is a city in the Loja Province of Ecuador. It is the seat of the Macará Canton and is on the border between Ecuador and Peru. 

The population as of a 1995 census was 11,841 and in 2009 it had an estimated population of 12,896.

It is served by José María Velasco Ibarra Airport.

See also
List of cities in Ecuador

References

Populated places in Loja Province